Jules Gervais-Courtellemont (1863–1931) was a French photographer who was famous for taking color autochromes during World War I.

Life 
He was born near Fontainebleau in Avon, Seine-et-Marne, south of Paris. He emigrated with his parents in 1874 to Algeria, where they started a family agricultural business that quickly failed. He remained in Algeria for 20 years, developing a passion for the pre-colonial Orient. He spent most of his professional career in search of the exotic. In 1894 he converted to Islam, prior to making a pilgrimage to Mecca. His book Mon Voyage a la Mecque was published by Hachette in 1896.

After experiments with monochrome photography, he adopted the Lumière brothers' Autochrome system, which went on sale in June 1907. In 1911, Courtellemont opened the "Palais de l'autochromie" at 167 rue Montmartre in Paris. It comprised an exhibition hall, studio, laboratory, and lecture hall with seating capacity of 250. It was in this hall that Courtellemont would project his autochromes of the Orient. Images collected in Turkey, Palestine, Egypt, Tunisia, Spain, India, Morocco and China formed the basis for his popular illustrated lectures, which he illustrated with lantern slides.

With the outbreak of World War I, Courtellemont returned to his home province to record the war. He continued to show his war photographs at the "Palais," particularly the Marne battlefields. His lectures proved so popular that Courtellemont issued a 12-part series of the First Battle of the Marne, later bound in book form as Les champs de bataille de la Marne, and a four-part series entitled Les champs de bataille de Verdun about the Battle of Verdun. These were the first books ever published in color on war. Between 1923 and 1925 he wrote a three-volume work entitled La Civilisation – Histoire sociale de l'humanité, illustrated with his photographs.

After the war, Courtellemont worked for an American publication. He eventually became a photographer for National Geographic.  

He was a lifelong friend of the novelist, Orientalist and photographer Pierre Loti. His German contemporary, who made autochromes of German troops during World War 1, was Hans Hildenbrand.

Courtellemont died in 1931.

Style 
Courtellemont's work displays a tight sense of composition, an acute awareness of the interplay of light on color, and a haunting familiarity of symbolism. Landscapes are carefully composed, with attention to lighting and placement within the picture frame. He used symbols, such as ae lonely cross and a charred tree, for dramatic effect.

Gallery

References

External links
Luminous Lint – Photographer – Jules Gervais-Courtellemont
Jules Gervais-Courtellemont (1863–1931)
Jules Gervais Courtellemont – Dancers in Pink with Flowers
 Autochromes by Hans Hildenbrand from World War I

War photographers
French photojournalists
Photography in China
Photography in Turkey
1931 deaths
1863 births
Converts to Islam